A walkover, also W.O. or w/o (originally two words: "walk over") is awarded to the opposing team/player etc, if there are no other players available, or they have been disqualified, because the other contestants have forfeited or the other contestants have withdrawn from the contest. The term can apply in sport, elections or other contexts where a victory can be achieved by default. The narrow and extended meanings of "walkover" as a single word are both found from 1829.

Sports

The word originates from horseracing in the United Kingdom, where an entrant in a one-horse race run under Jockey Club rules has at least to "walk over" the course before being awarded victory. This outcome was quite common at a time when there was no guaranteed prize money for horses finishing second or third, so there was no incentive to run a horse in a race it could not win. The 18th-century champion racehorse Eclipse was so dominant over his contemporaries that he was allowed to walk over on nine occasions, and the 1828 Epsom Derby winner Cadland walked over on at least six occasions. The full formality of walking (or otherwise riding) over the entire track in a one-horse race remained in the rules governing racing until 2006; it was replaced by the lesser formality of making correct weight and riding past the judge's box to be declared the winner.

The actual act of 'walking over' was seen in Australian rules football matches during the 19th and early 20th centuries. It was not uncommon in the 19th century for a scheduled match to be cancelled on the day, often due to one of the two teams failing to field enough players, but these were generally considered no-game or rescheduled. The first team to claim victory by walkover on such an occasion was Albert-park, in an 1870 match against Railway which was to have counted towards the Challenge Cup. Railway had insufficient players and declined to play, so the Albert-park team took to the field with the umpire and without opposition and put through two goals, claiming a walkover victory. The claimed victory and its impact on the Challenge Cup was controversial and widely disputed by the other clubs; one sportswriter at the time commented that "in connection with football, the idea of a walkover is simply absurd and unprecedented." Nevertheless, actual walkovers were thereafter often observed in similar circumstances: the umpire would bounce the ball to officially start the game, the unopposed team would score at least once to secure a lead, and the match would then be abandoned. The highest level occurrence of this was in a Victorian Football Association match in 1900, and sporadic reports from games at the local level confirm that actual walkovers were observed as late as the 1930s, including outside Melbourne.

In the 1908 Summer Olympics, there was a walkover for a gold medal was by Wyndham Halswelle in the rerun of the final race of the 400 m: Hallswelle's two American opponents refused to participate in the rerun, protesting the controversial disqualification of their teammate. Hallswelle jogged in the rerun alone to claim the gold medal.

In the 1920 Summer Olympics sailing program, there were a total of sixteen different yacht classes – no other Olympic games sailed more than seven classes until the 1980s – spreading the competitors so thinly that there were six gold medals won by walkover, each of those yachts completing its course unopposed to claim gold. A seventh yacht, Francis Richards' entrant in the 18' dinghy, also attempted a walkover but did not finish the course; this crew is officially recognized as gold medalists by the International Olympic Committee, but was not mentioned in the most official contemporary report by games organizers, casting doubt over whether or not the crew actually received gold medals at the time due to not finishing the course. There were also two of the sixteen classes with no entrants at all.

A walkover occurred in the 2020 Summer Olympics in sport climbing. French climber Bassa Mawem was injured in his last climb during qualification and was unable to compete in the finals, but IFSC rules did not allow him to be replaced. His opening round speed climbing opponent in the finals, Czech climber Adam Ondra, was made to race unopposed up the wall to advance.

A walkover was observed in football in the second leg of the 1974 FIFA World Cup qualification playoff between the Soviet Union and Chile. The Soviet Union refused to play in Chile two months after the 1973 Chilean coup d'état, and FIFA awarded the game to Chile by a nominal 1–0 result; but the walkover itself was still staged, the Chilean team taking the field and captain Francisco Valdés scoring an unopposed goal in front of a crowd of 15,000.

In a more general sense, the term 'walkover' is used broadly across many sports for a forfeiture due to one team being unable or unwilling to play, even if no actual act of walking over occurs. In some instances, there are distinctions between walkovers and other victories by default: for example, in tennis a walkover occurs when a player withdraws prior to the match, but not when a player retired due to injury during a match. Many sporting bodies have a nominal score applied in the case of walkover for the purposes of points differential tiebreakers; the 2019 Pan American Games women's basketball tournament, for example, awarded a 20–0 walkover victory to Colombia when their Argentinian opponents turned up with the wrong uniforms. Colloquially, an extremely one-sided game may also be called a 'walkover', implying a similar score could have been achieved without the losing team's presence.

Other uses
In poker games that use blinds, a hand is considered a walkover (usually shortened to walk) when no other players call or raise the big blind, resulting in the player who posted the big blind winning the hand without opposition. Walks are most often seen in tournament play, since cash games often allow the players to "split the blinds" (i.e. take back their blind bets in case there are no callers or raisers by the time the action gets to the small blind). Chopping is not permitted in tournaments.

An uncontested election is often referred to as a walkover, when it is also referred to as winning "by default". The word is used more generally by extension for an election in which the winner is not the only participant but where no opponent has a credible chance of victory.

References

Sports terminology